Thompson-Brown-Sandusky House, also known as the Jess Marriott House, is a historic home located at St. Joseph, Missouri.  It was built about 1850, and is a -story, Federal style brick dwelling with one-story flanking wings. It has a one-story front porch with Doric order columns.

It was listed on the National Register of Historic Places in 1983.

References

Houses on the National Register of Historic Places in Missouri
Federal architecture in Missouri
Houses completed in 1850
Houses in St. Joseph, Missouri
National Register of Historic Places in Buchanan County, Missouri